Prekonozi is a village in the municipality of Aleksinac, Serbia. According to the 2002 census, the village has a population of 173 people.

References

Populated places in Nišava District